J. terrae may refer to:

Janibacter terrae, a Gram-positive bacterium.
Jeotgalibacillus terrae, a Gram-positive bacterium in the genus Jeotgalibacillus.